Strange but True is a 2019 American thriller film directed by Rowan Athale from a screenplay by Eric Garcia. The film is an adaptation of the 2004 novel of the same name by John Searles and stars Amy Ryan, Nick Robinson, Margaret Qualley, Blythe Danner, Brian Cox, Greg Kinnear and Connor Jessup.

It had its world premiere at the Edinburgh International Film Festival on June 22, 2019. It was released on September 6, 2019, by CBS Films.

Plot
Ronnie Chase died on prom night. Five years later, Melissa Moody, Ronnie's past girlfriend, arrives at his mother's house and says she is pregnant with Ronnie's baby. Melissa states that the only man she has ever had sex with was Ronnie and she plays a recording of a psychic reading she received to Charlene and Philip, Ronnie's mother and younger brother. Charlene angrily asks her to leave.

Melissa is shown at the home of Bill and Gail Erwin, who have taken her in because her parents don't like her foray into mysticism and obsession with Ronnie's death. Melissa's blackouts are mentioned, as is Bill's penchant for smoking in secret. Bill has a cough and Gail wants him to see a doctor, but he blows it off. Later, Gail is doing laundry and finds Bill's cigarette stash, as well as a half-used blister pack of pills. She heads to the pharmacy to ask about them.

After a tense breakfast between Charlene and Philip, Philip puts forth the idea that Ronnie's frozen sperm could have been used to impregnate Melissa. Charlene goes to the library, where she used to work, to research the idea and then calls her ex-husband, Richard, who is a physician. She asks him whether or not frozen sperm can be used to impregnate someone. Richard hangs up and later calls Philip and then Bill's Hardware. Meanwhile, Philip visits the same psychic Melissa saw, who tells him he needs to move on from Ronnie's death.

Charlene goes to the Erwin's home to speak to Melissa. However, Gail answers the door and mentions that she is thankful that Richard pays rent on behalf of Melissa while she stays in their lodge. Charlene calls Richard again, angry about what Gail has told her. Holly, Richard's new wife, answers the phone and states that Richard is heading to New York to see Charlene. Charlene intercepts Richard at the airport and confronts him about paying Melissa's rent. On the way home, they argue about Melissa and the aftermath of Ronnie's death.

Philip has gone to see Melissa at her cottage. They talk about Philip's broken leg, which broke when he allowed a car run into him while he worked as a bike messenger. He had moved to New York City because of a plan he made with Ronnie before he died and then was looking for an excuse to leave. Melissa discusses her blackouts and her dreams of Ronnie. Gail meanwhile returns home from the pharmacy and angrily confronts Bill in the basement of their home. She discovered the pills are Rohypnol that he has been secretly giving to Melissa and raping her, thus causing her blackouts and her pregnancy. Gail and Bill end up in a struggle on the stairway. She falls down the stairs and dies on the floor. At the cabin, Melissa's labor begins and Philip takes her to his car to drive her to the hospital. However, she wants him to find Gail and Bill so they can go together. Philip looks through the basement window and sees Bill sitting by Gail's body. Philip's phone rings, which causes Bill to notice him, and Bill goes outside with a shotgun to find him. Philip abruptly drops a call to his mother so his parents know to head over to the Erwin's home, sensing that Philip is distraught. Bill chases Philip through the woods, eventually catching him and knocking him out with the butt of the shotgun. Melissa drives herself to the hospital.

Bill digs a shallow grave in his barn to bury Philip. Charlene and Richard show up at the house and Bill is able to convince them nothing is amiss. However, Charlene sees one of Philip's crutches on the ground outside. Charlene and Richard go into the house after hearing Phil's phone ring only to find Gail's dead body. Bill attempts to bury Philip alive, but Philip begins to struggle, calling out so Richard and Charlene hear. Bill starts to choke Philip, but Philip is able to knock over the shotgun and pull the trigger, alerting his parents. Richard charges in and stands with Philip. Bill raises the shotgun towards Richard and Philip but then Charlene moves to stand between them. Bill says he didn't mean to hurt her and then kills himself.

Melissa gives birth to her baby and a flashback shows the night Ronnie died in an accident while being chauffeured in a limousine. He was standing out the sunroof shouting that he loved Melissa, at her behest, and the limo driver was distracted. Charlene is seen holding Melissa's baby while Philip and Richard look on.

Cast

Production
In May 2017, it was announced Amy Ryan, Greg Kinnear, Nick Robinson, Margaret Qualley, Connor Jessup, and Blythe Danner had joined the cast of the film, with Rowan Althe directing from a screenplay by Eric Garcia. In June 2017, Mena Massoud joined the cast of the film. Filming took place in Toronto.

Release
In February 2018, CBS Films acquired distribution rights to the film. It had its world premiere at the Edinburgh International Film Festival on June 22, 2019. It was released on September 6, 2019.

References

External links
https://www.rottentomatoes.com/m/strange_but_true

2019 films
2019 thriller films
American pregnancy films
American thriller films
CBS Films films
Films about rape
Films based on American thriller novels
Films shot in Toronto
2010s English-language films
2010s American films